The , WAB 16, is a festive cantata composed by Anton Bruckner in 1862 for the celebration of the laying of the foundation stone of the new Mariä-Empfängnis-Dom of Linz.

History 

To celebrate the laying of the foundation stone of the new  (Cathedral of the Immaculate Conception) of Linz, bishop Franz-Josef Rudigier asked Bruckner for a cantata. Bruckner responded enthusiastly with the composition of the Festive Cantata Preiset den Herrn (Praise the Lord) on a text of the theologian Maximilian Pammesberger.

On 1 May 1862 the foundation stone was laid. To celebrate the event the cantata was performed by the choir Frohsinn, invited guest singers and the brass band of the Infantry Regiment Freiherr von Bamberg No. 13 under the baton of Engelbert Lanz.

The Festive Cantata, WAB 16, is the first notable religious work that Bruckner composed after his strenuous study period by Sechter. It will be followed one year later by Psalm 112 (1863), and again one year later by the secular cantata Germanenzug and the first great mass, Mass No. 1 in D minor (1864).

The Festive Cantata was performed by Theodor Guschlbauer on 6 September 1980 during the Brucknerfest. A recording of this performance is available in the Bruckner Archive. The Cantata  was also performed on 10 June 2022 during a concert to celebrate Neeme Järvi’s 85th anniversary.

The manuscript of the cantata is stored in the archive of the Episcopacy of Linz. A facsimile was first published in volume III/2, pp. 197–216 of the Göllerich/Auer biography. A choir and piano score has been issued by Doblinger in 1955.

Text 
The cantata uses a text of the theologian Maximilian Pammesberger.
{|
|
|style="padding-left:2em;"|Praise the Lord,
Sing the praises of His holy name!
My Lord, Thou art the fundament and cornerstone
Of Thy great and noble church.

Thaw Thy power and force
On foundation and stone,
Which we sink devoutly 
Into the holy work!

Praise the Lord, praise Mary,
Conceived immaculate!

From the bowels of the earth
The building is growing
Striking greatly
Into the blue of the sky.

This is the house of the Immaculate,
In which the source of grace
Arises and streams rich and pure
Into the country.

The tribes from all the districts of the country
Go on a devout pilgrimage to the cathedral
Of our blessed Lady;
They greet her times without number
And find salvation in the room of grace
By faith and trust.

Praise the Lord,
Sing the praises of His holy name,
Praise Mary,
The mighty helper. Amen.
|}

Setting 
The 241-bar long work in D major for men's chorus, male solo quartet, bass soloist, and wind band (2 flutes, 2 oboes, 4 clarinets, 2 bassoons, 4 horns, 3 trumpets, 3 trombones, 1 bass tuba and timpani), is composed of eight short parts:
 Opening choir: "Preiset den Herrn", D major veering to F minor – Bewegt, doch nicht zu schnell
 Aria: "Taue deine Kraft und Stärke", A major veering to F major – Solo quartet a cappella, choir repeat with woodwinds (flute, clarinet and bassoon) – Langsam, bittend
 Bridging choir: "Preiset den Herrn", D major – Bewegt, nicht zu schnell
 Arioso: "Aus der Erde Schoß", G major – Bass soloist – Langsam, nicht schleppend
 Aria: "Das ist der Unbefleckten Haus", E major – Solo quartet a cappella with internal repetition – Langsam bewegt
 Prelude by reed instruments (clarinets and bassoons), E major veering to G major
 Chorale: "Des Landes Stämme wallen fromm", a cappella, G major
 Final choir "Preiset den Herrn", D major – Bewegt, nicht zu schnell
Total duration: 10 to 13 minutes.

The opening choir with its starting octave leap in unison, as in the Overture in G minor, and its reminiscence to the Arneth Cantata is majestic and solemn. It thereafter evolves in a fugato on "Grund und Eckstein bist du, o Herr". To bind the work together the solemn opening choir is repeated twice, in the third and eight parts.

Preiset den Herrn … demonstrates Bruckner’s primary concerns at the time of composition—form and orchestration. His interest in form is reflected in the closely related melodies, repetition of motives among the movements, and especially in the finale, which sums up the entire composition, by making reference to much of what has preceded it. … The contrast of full ensemble with a variety of smaller groups is convincing, and Bruckner has made effective use of the timbral resources available to him. … Bruckner’s chord and key choices are often surprising and indicate that he was developing much more confidence in his unorthodox harmonic ideas.

Selected discography 
A commercial recording in full accordance with the original score edited by the critical Gesamtausgabe is still awaited.

Out of the seven commercial recordings, Fiala's live performance – with trombones colla parte during the choir repeat of part 2 (mm. 70–82) – is the most in accordance with the original score. Kerbl's live recording – with organ colla parte  for a cappella parts 2, 5 and 7 – is, according to Hans Roelofs, also a convincing performance.

The Festive Cantata has undergone several adaptations: for choir, only with organ accompaniment, for mixed choir with a different text ...The two recordings by Track follow his own adaptations, one for male-voice choir (1990), the other as Festkantate zur Weihnacht (festive Christmas cantata) for mixed choir with Herbert Vogg’s text "Ehre sei Gott in der Höhe" (1996).

In the version for male-voice choir the Arioso (part 4) is skipped. Parts 2 and 5 are accompanied by organ, part 7 is sung a cappella.
In the version for mixed choir (Festkantate zur Weihnacht) part 4 is sung by the male voices with the original instruments, parts 2, 5 – converted to C major – and 7 are sung by the whole choir with organ. Because of the female voices and the organ accompaniment this version sounds smoother than the original version.
 Martin L. Fiala, Steyrer Männergesang-Verein Sängerlust and Bläserkreis Oberösterreichischer Landesmusikschullehrer, Festkonzert – CD: Ensemble Electronique EE-004CD, 1994 (Live)
 Thomas Kerbl, Männerchorvereinigung Bruckner 08, Ensemble Linz, Philipp Sonntag (Organ), Anton Bruckner, Männerchöre – CD: Bruckner Haus LIVA027, 2008 (Live)
 Gerhard Track, Wiener Männergesang-Verein, Wiener Schubertbund, Slovak Radio Symphony Orchestra, Manfred Schiebel (Organ), Ausgewählte Chorwerke – CD issued by the Wiener Schubertbund, 1990 (Live)
 Gerhard Track, Choir and Symphony Orchestra of the Konservatorium Wien, Manfred Schiebel (Organ), Gerhard Track dirigiert Anton Bruckner – CD: PMI Records-USA PMI 20105, 1996 (Live)

References

Sources 
 August Göllerich, Anton Bruckner. Ein Lebens- und Schaffens-Bild,  – posthumous edited by Max Auer by G. Bosse, Regensburg, 1932
 Anton Bruckner – Sämtliche Werke, Band XXII/2: Kantaten und Chorwerke II (1862–1893), Musikwissenschaftlicher Verlag der Internationalen Bruckner-Gesellschaft, Franz Burkhart, Rudolf H. Führer and Leopold Nowak (Editor), Vienna, 1987 (Available on IMSLP: Neue Gesamtausgabe, XXII/2. Kantaten und Chorwerke Teil 2: Nr. 6-8)
 John Williamson, The Cambridge Companion to Bruckner, Cambridge University Press, Cambridge, 2004. 
 Cornelis van Zwol, Anton Bruckner - Leven en Werken , Thot, Bussum (Netherlands), 2012. 
 Uwe Harten, Anton Bruckner. Ein Handbuch. , Salzburg, 1996. .
 Crawford Howie, Anton Bruckner - A documentary biography, online revised edition

External links 
 
 Festkantate D-Dur, WAB 16 Critical discography by Hans Roelofs  
 can be heard on YouTube: Bruckner's Festive cantata, Clemens Haudum, Men's choir of the Tölzer Boys' choir, winds of the Munich Symphonic orchestra, 28 March 2014 - live performance in accordance with the original score

Cantatas by Anton Bruckner
1862 compositions